"Bomdigi" is a song by American hip hop artist Erick Sermon recorded for his second album Double or Nothing (1995). The song was released as the first single for the album on October 17, 1995. The music video was directed by Terry Heller & Chuck Ozeas.

The song peaked at number eighty-four on the Billboard Hot 100 chart.

Track listing
7", 12", 33 RPM, CD, Vinyl
"Bomdigi" (Radio Version) - 3:33
"Bomdigi" (LP Version) - 3:33
"Bomdigi" (Instrumental) - 3:33
"Bomdigi" (Acapella) - 3:28
"Tell 'Em" (Radio Version) - 2:35
"Tell 'Em" (LP Version) - 2:35
"Bomdigi" (Remix) - 3:32(feat. Tommy Gunn)

Chart performance

Personnel
Information taken from Discogs.
co-production – Erick Sermon, Sugarless
mixing – Troy Hightower
production – Rod "KP" Kirkpatrick, Erick Sermon
vocals – Keith Murray, Roslyn Noble
vocals (background) – Crystal Gamble

Notes

1995 singles
Erick Sermon songs
Song recordings produced by Erick Sermon
1995 songs
Def Jam Recordings singles
Songs written by Rick James
Songs written by Erick Sermon